Karate at the 2005 Islamic Solidarity Games was held at the Uhod Club Hall, Medina, Saudi Arabia from April 9 to April 14, 2005.

Medalists

Kata

Kumite

Medal table

References
  kooora.com

2005 Islamic Solidarity Games
Islamic Solidarity Games
2005